Sagada is the name of several rural localities in Russia.

Modern localities
Sagada, Republic of Dagestan, a rural locality (a selo) in Tlyatsudinsky Selsoviet of Tsuntinsky District in the Republic of Dagestan; 

Renamed localities
Sagada, in 1944–1957, name of Belty, a rural locality (a selo) in Yalkhoy-Mokhkskaya Rural Administration of Kurchaloyevsky District in the Chechen Republic